The Association of American Universities (AAU) is an organization of American research universities devoted to maintaining a strong system of academic research and education. Founded in 1900, it consists of 63 universities in the United States (both public and private) and two universities in Canada—the University of Toronto and McGill University.  AAU membership is by invitation only and requires an affirmative vote of three-quarters of current members.

Organization
The AAU was founded on February 28, 1900, by a group of 14 Doctor of Philosophy degree-granting universities in the United States to strengthen and standardize American doctoral programs. American universities—starting with Johns Hopkins University in 1876—were adopting the research-intensive German model of higher education. Lack of standardization damaged European universities' opinions of their American counterparts and many American students attended graduate school in Europe instead of staying in the U.S. The presidents of Harvard University, Columbia University, Johns Hopkins University, the University of Chicago, and the University of California sent a letter of invitation to nine other universities—Clark University, Catholic University of America, Cornell University, the University of Michigan, Princeton University, the University of Pennsylvania, Stanford University, the University of Wisconsin, and Yale University—to meet in Chicago in February 1900 to promote and raise standards. The AAU's founding members elected Harvard's Charles William Eliot as the association's first president and Stanford's David Starr Jordan as its first chairman.

In 1914, the AAU began accrediting undergraduate education at its member and other schools. German universities used the "AAU Accepted List" to determine whether a college's graduates were qualified for graduate programs. Regional accreditation agencies existed in the U.S. by the 1920s, and the AAU ended accrediting schools in 1948.

For its first six decades, the AAU functioned as a club for the presidents and deans of elite research universities to informally discuss educational matters, and its day-to-day operations were managed by an executive secretary.  In the 1970s, the AAU shifted to a role of active advocacy on behalf of its members' interests; dues were raised, more staff members were hired, and its chief executive was given the title of president and the duty of becoming far more publicly visible than his predecessors.

Today, the AAU consists of 65 U.S. and Canadian universities of varying sizes and missions that share a commitment to research. The organization's primary purpose is to provide a forum for the development and implementation of institutional and national policies in order to strengthen programs in academic research, scholarship, and education at the undergraduate, graduate, and professional levels.

Benefits
The largest attraction of the AAU for many schools, especially nonmembers, is prestige. Since the AAU's founding, it has "been a grouping of the elite in the American university world," and "[n]ew presidents of nonmember universities often list gaining admission to the AAU as a goal of their administration."  For example, in 2010 the chancellor of nonmember North Carolina State University described it as "the pre-eminent research-intensive membership group. To be a part of that organization is something N.C. State aspires to." A spokesman for nonmember University of Connecticut called it "perhaps the most elite organization in higher education. You'd probably be hard-pressed to find a major research university that didn't want to be a member of the AAU." In 2012, the newly elected chancellor of University of Massachusetts Amherst, a nonmember of AAU, reaffirmed the objective of elevating the campus to AAU standards and the hope of becoming a member in the near future, and called it a distinctive status. Because of the lengthy and difficult entrance process, boards of trustees, state legislators, and donors often see membership as evidence of the quality of a university.

The AAU acts as a lobbyist at its headquarters in Washington, DC, for research and higher education funding and for policy and regulatory issues affecting research universities. The association holds two meetings annually, both in Washington. Separate meetings are held for university presidents, provosts, and other officials. Because the meetings are private, they offer the opportunity for discussion without media coverage. Prominent government officials, businessmen, and others often speak to the groups.

Presidents

Statistics
, AAU members accounted for 58 percent of U.S. universities' research grants and contract income and 52 percent of all doctorates awarded in the United States. Since 1999, 43 percent of all Nobel Prize winners and 74 percent of winners at U.S. institutions have been affiliated with an AAU university. Approximately two-thirds of the American Academy of Arts and Sciences 2006 Class of Fellows are affiliated with an AAU university. The faculties at AAU universities include 2,993 members of the United States National Academies (82 percent of all members): the National Academy of Sciences, the National Academy of Engineering, and the Institute of Medicine (2004).

 Undergraduate students: 1,044,759; 7 percent nationally
 Undergraduate degrees awarded: 235,328; 17 percent nationally
 Graduate students: 418,066; 20 percent nationally
 Master's degrees awarded: 106,971; 19 percent nationally
 Professional degrees awarded: 20,859; 25 percent nationally
 Doctorates awarded: 22,747; 52 percent nationally
 Postdoctoral fellows: 30,430; 67 percent nationally
 Students studying abroad: 57,205
 National Merit/Achievement Scholars (2004): 5,434; 63 percent nationally
 Faculty: approximately 72,000

Membership
AAU membership is by invitation only, which requires an affirmative vote of three-fourths of current members. Invitations are considered periodically, based in part on an assessment of the breadth and quality of university programs of research and graduate education, as well as undergraduate education. The association ranks its members using four criteria: research spending, the percentage of faculty who are members of the National Academies, faculty awards, and citations. Non-member universities whose research and education profile exceeds that of a number of current members may be invited to join the association; current members whose research and education profile falls significantly below that of other current members or below the criteria for admission of new members will be subject to further review and possible discontinuation of membership. A vote by two-thirds of the member institutions can revoke membership for poor rankings.  annual dues are $80,500. All 63 U.S. members of the AAU are also classified as Highest Research Activity (R1) Universities by the Carnegie Classification of Institutions of Higher Education, as are three of the five former AAU members.

Current members

Former members

Map of schools

Advocacy
In 2014, the AAU supported the proposed Research and Development Efficiency Act arguing that the legislation "can lead to a long-needed reduction in the regulatory burden currently imposed on universities and their faculty members who conduct research on behalf of the federal government." According to the AAU, "too often federal requirements" for accounting for federal grant money "are ill-conceived, ineffective, and/or duplicative." This wastes the researchers' times and "reduces the time they can devote to discovery and innovation and increases institutional compliance costs."

Similar organizations in other countries
Similar organizations around the world include the Russell Group (United Kingdom), U15 (Germany), League of European Research Universities (Europe), BRICS Universities League (BRICS), Association of East Asian Research Universities (mainland China, Japan, South Korea, Hong Kong, and Taiwan), C9 League (China), Group of Eight (Australia), RU11 (Japan), and the U15 Group of Canadian Research Universities (Canada).

See also
 List of higher education associations and alliances
 List of research universities in the United States

Notes

References

External links
 

Organizations established in 1900
College and university associations and consortia in Canada
College and university associations and consortia in the United States